An off-year election is a general election in the United States that is held when neither a presidential election nor a midterm election takes place. Almost all "off-year" elections are held on odd-numbered years. At times, the term "off-year" may also be used to refer to midterm election years. "Off-cycle" can also refer to any election that doesn't take place on November of an even-numbered year.

Off-year elections during odd-numbered years rarely feature any election to a federal office, few state legislative elections, and very few gubernatorial elections. Instead, the vast majority of these elections are held at the county and municipal level. On the ballot are many mayors, a wide variety of citizen initiatives in various states, and many more local public offices. They may also feature a number of special elections to fill vacancies in various federal, state, and local offices.

Background and rationale
Off-year elections often feature far fewer races than either presidential or midterm elections and generate far lower voter turnout than even-numbered election years.  

While presidential elections have always been held on even-numbered years, this was not always the case for congressional elections. Before Congress began to standardize elections for the House of Representatives in 1872, individual states could schedule theirs into the first months of an odd-numbered year. Senate elections were more problematic prior to the ratification of the Seventeenth Amendment in 1913. Under the original rules of Article 1, Section 3 of the U.S. Constitution, senators were chosen by state legislatures instead of direct elections. This meant that they were affected by legislative deadlock, and seats would remain vacant for months or years until their state legislatures could agree on who to send to the Senate.

The political calculations of incumbent politicians appears to be the most common thread over the years guiding decisions around election timing for the few states with off-year elections. The lower turnout also benefits well-organized special interest groups that often make up local political machines, making it easier for their favored candidates to capture more of a government. Even though large majorities from both major political parties want to shift to on-cycle elections, these interest groups have used their political power to slow down some but not all of the reform efforts, with California, Arizona and Nevada seeing significant success in shifting local elections on-cycle.

Federal elections
Regularly scheduled elections for the Senate and the House of Representatives are always held in even-numbered years. Elections for these offices are only held during odd-numbered years if accommodating a special election—usually either due to incumbents resigning or dying while in office.

Special elections are never held for the U.S. President. If the President dies, resigns or is (via impeachment conviction) removed from office, the successor is determined by the presidential line of succession, as specified by the United States Constitution and the Presidential Succession Act, and serves the rest of the presidential term.

State elections
Five states elect their respective governors to four-year terms during off-year elections: Kentucky, Louisiana, Mississippi, New Jersey and Virginia. Kentucky, Louisiana, and Mississippi hold their gubernatorial elections during the off-year before the presidential election; e.g. the 2019 elections. New Jersey and Virginia then hold theirs in the off-year after the presidential election; e.g. the 2021 elections.

Louisiana, Mississippi, New Jersey, and Virginia also hold off-year state legislative elections.

Off-years may also feature a wide variety of citizen initiatives in various states, as well as a number of special elections to fill various state offices. States may also allow recall elections, such as the 2021 California gubernatorial recall election.

Local elections
Many races held during off-year, odd-numbered election years are for offices at the municipal and local level. Other municipalities and local governments instead consolidate their elections in even-numbered years to save costs, increase voter turnout, have a far more representative group of voters.

Comparison with other U.S. General Elections

See also 
Primary election
Recall election
Runoff election

Notes

Works cited
 

Elections in the United States